The Academy of Science (AOS) is a STEM program for high school students enrolled in Loudoun County Public Schools. The program was previously located in Dominion High School. During the summer of 2018, the Academy of Science joined the Monroe Advanced Technical Academy (MATA) and the new Academy of Engineering and Technology (AET) to form the Academies of Loudoun (ACL). The Academies of Loudoun opened with a new campus located in Leesburg, Virginia.

History and structure
The Academy of Science program was established in 2005 as a magnet program for Loudoun County high school students. The coursework focuses on science and math with a Dual Enrollment and numerous Advanced Placement Courses. In the final two years, students take an independent research class.

Admissions
Applications to join the Academy of Science begin in student's final year of middle school. Applicants are judged based on test scores, a writing section, and grades.

AOS and AET came under scrutiny in 2019 by the NAACP for alleged discrimination against black students during the admission process.

Extracurricular activities and athletics
Loudoun County high schools have alternating block schedule that allows Academies students to attend both their home high school as well as the academies. ACL has extracurricular available to students during their lunch period, but no athletic teams exist at the Academies. Students attending the Academies are able to join extracurricular and sports at their home high schools.

Research
In the final two years attending AOS, students take a research course. The students work either independently or with another student to investigate a topic chosen by them and approved by their mentors. The Academies have a large amount of scientific instrumentation that would not be available at most high schools. Students are given the opportunity to collaborate with students of the Hwa Chong Institution in Singapore and Daegu Science High School in South Korea.

Research projects from AOS have been published and have placed in competitions like the Siemens Westinghouse Competition and International Science and Engineering Fair.

References

Schools in Loudoun County, Virginia
Public high schools in Virginia
Magnet schools in Virginia
Alternative schools in the United States
Educational institutions established in 2005
2005 establishments in Virginia